Humberto Contreras (born August 21, 1983) is a Mexican figure skater. He is a four-time Mexican national champion ('02, '03, '05, '09) and competed in the final segment at six Four Continents Championships.

Career
Contreras began learning to skate in 1997. Early in his career, he was coached by Darin Carlton, Alexei Muratov (2001–02), Alesandro Chavez (2002–03), and Wendy Boyland (2003–04) in Mexico City. At the 2004 Four Continents Championships, he became the first Mexican skater to perform a triple Salchow triple Loop combination in competition.

In May 2004, Contreras began training under Julie Graham and Rocio Salas in Marlborough, Massachusetts. By the 2008–09 season, his coach was Elvis Stojko in Guadalajara, Jalisco.

Contreras retired from competition in 2010.

Programs

Results

References

External links
 

1983 births
Mexican male single skaters
Living people
Sportspeople from Mexico City